Sebastiano Martinelli (20 August 1848 – 4 July 1918) was a Cardinal of the Roman Catholic Church who served as Prefect of the Congregation of Rites.

Early life
Sebastiano Martinelli was born in Borgo Sant'Anna within the Archdiocese of Lucca, Italy. He was the son of Cosma Martinelli and Maddalena Pardini. His brother was Cardinal Tommaso Martinelli. He studied in the San Michele Seminary in Lucca and later the Collegio Sant'Agostino in Rome. He joined the Order of the Hermits of Saint Augustine (Augustinians) on 6 December 1863 and was professed on 6 January 1865.

Ecclesiastical career

Priesthood
He was ordained on 4 March 1871 in Rome. He served as a professor of theology at the Santa Maria in Posterula College, Rome. He was named postulator causarum servorum Dei of the Augustinian Order in 1881. He became prior general of his Order in 1889 and was reelected in 1895.

Episcopate

He was appointed apostolic delegate to the United States on 18 April 1896 by Pope Leo XIII and titular archbishop of Ephesus on 18 August 1896.  He was consecrated on 30 August 1896, by Mariano Rampolla, Cardinal Secretary of State. He took possession of the apostolic delegation on 4 October 1896.  He was much more popular than his predecessor, Cardinal Satolli.  In this role, he attended the dedication of  St. Mary's Church in Dedham, Massachusetts.

Cardinalate
He was created and proclaimed Cardinal-Priest of Sant'Agostino by Pope Leo XIII on 15 April 1901, and received the red hat on 9 June 1902. He participated in the 1903 conclave that elected Pope Pius X. He was a member of the commission, headed by Cardinal Pietro Gasparri, for the codification of canon law (1906–1917). He was Camerlengo of the Sacred College of Cardinals from 15 April 1907 until 29 April 1909. He was appointed Prefect of the Sacred Congregation of Rites on 8 February 1909. He did not participate in the conclave of 1914 that elected Pope Benedict XV because of illness. He died in Rome on 4 July 1918, and is buried in Rome's Campo Verano cemetery.

Personality and appearance
The New York Times, upon Martinelli's arrival in America as the new apostolic delegate in 1896, published a thorough assessment of the bishop's personal appearance and personality. The newspaper described him thus: 
[Bishop Martinelli speaks] excellent English, with only a slight accent. His voice is soft and musical, and he is very graceful, with an attractive manner. He is a small man, not over 5 feet 5 inches in height, of good build, and he has a typical Italian face. He is very dark, his hair is black and his eyes brilliantly black. The eyes are of the kind that seem to look clear through one. They are the most pronounced feature of their possessor. He has a very square jaw, and when he smiles there is a slight curl of the under lip . Altogether the face is one that strikes an observer as that of a more than ordinarily intelligent man.

Notes and references
Notes

References

Works cited

External links

Apostolic Nuncios to the United States
20th-century Italian cardinals
Cardinals created by Pope Leo XIII
1848 births
1918 deaths
Members of the Sacred Congregation for Rites
Burials at Campo Verano